La Herradura is a municipality in the La Paz Department, El Salvador.

External links
San Luis La Herradura Official Website

Municipalities of the La Paz Department (El Salvador)